Børge Christensen may refer to:
 Børge Christensen (footballer)
 Børge Christensen (sport shooter)